William Bunting Snowball (January 12, 1865 – September 27, 1925) was a Canadian politician. He was the eldest son of Jabez Bunting Snowball, a politician who became Lieutenant-Governor of New Brunswick.

Snowball served as the Mayor of the Town of Chatham, New Brunswick for four terms. He was elected to the House of Commons of Canada from the riding of Northumberland, New Brunswick as a Liberal in a by-election on October 1, 1924, but served for less than a year before dying suddenly on September 27, 1925.

Snowball was educated at Upper Canada College.

References

1865 births
1925 deaths
Liberal Party of Canada MPs
Members of the House of Commons of Canada from New Brunswick
People from Miramichi, New Brunswick
Mayors of Miramichi, New Brunswick